The 1986–87 Yugoslav Second League season was the 41st season of the Second Federal League, the second level association football competition of SFR Yugoslavia, since its establishment in 1946. The league was contested in two regional groups (West Division and East Division), with 18 clubs each.

West Division

Teams
A total of eighteen teams contested the league, including thirteen sides from the 1985–86 season, one club relegated from the 1985–86 Yugoslav First League and four sides promoted from the Inter-Republic Leagues played in the 1985–86 season. The league was contested in a double round robin format, with each club playing every other club twice, for a total of 34 rounds. Two points were awarded for wins and one point for draws.

Vojvodina were relegated from the 1985–86 Yugoslav First League after finishing in the 18th place of the league table. The four clubs promoted to the second level were Sloga Doboj, Maribor, Mladost Petrinja and Dinamo Pančevo.

League table

East Division

Teams
A total of eighteen teams contested the league, including thirteen sides from the 1985–86 season, one club relegated from the 1985–86 Yugoslav First League and four sides promoted from the Inter-Republic Leagues played in the 1985–86 season. The league was contested in a double round robin format, with each club playing every other club twice, for a total of 34 rounds. Two points were awarded for wins and one point for draws.

OFK Belgrade were relegated from the 1985–86 Yugoslav First League after finishing in the 17th place of the league table. The four clubs promoted to the second level were Bokelj, Majdanpek, Pobeda and Vlaznimi Đakovica.

League table

See also
1986–87 Yugoslav First League
1986–87 Yugoslav Cup

Yugoslav Second League seasons
Yugo
2